The 2015–16 FC Girondins de Bordeaux season was the 135th professional season of the club since its creation in 1881. During this campaign, Bordeaux competed in Ligue 1, the top tier or French football, as well as the Coupe de France, the Coupe de la Ligue and the UEFA Europa League.

Players

French teams are limited to four players without EU citizenship. Hence, the squad list includes only the principal nationality of each player; several non-European players on the squad have dual citizenship with an EU country. Also, players from the ACP countries—countries in Africa, the Caribbean, and the Pacific that are signatories to the Cotonou Agreement—are not counted against non-EU quotas due to the Kolpak ruling.

Current squad

As of 1 February 2016.

Out on loan

Transfers

Transfers in

Loans in

Transfers out

Loans out

Pre-season and friendlies

Competitions

Ligue 1

League table

Results summary

Results by round

Matches

Coupe de France

Coupe de la Ligue

UEFA Europa League

Third Qualifying Round

Play-off Round

Group stage

Goalscorers

References

FC Girondins de Bordeaux seasons
Girondins de Bordeaux
Bordeaux